The 66th Santosh Trophy 2012 was held in Odisha from 11 May 2012 to 28 May 2012.

Calendar

The calendar for the 2012 Santosh Trophy, as announced by the All India Football Federation:

Qualifying rounds

Quarter-finals

Group A

Group B

Group C

Group D

Semi-finals

Final

References

2011–12 in Indian football
Santosh Trophy seasons
Sports competitions in Odisha